Kiarighat, Himachal Pradesh, India, is a small hill station situated at Kalka-Shimla National Highway, where tourists can stay for a while or stay overnight.  The JP university is located at about 8 km from here.

Access : Kiarighat is connected by Shimla-Kalka National Highway. It is 27 km away from Shimla and 19 km from Solan. The nearest Airport in Jubbal Hatti and nearest narrow gauge railway station is Kandaghat.

Climate : In winter, the temperature can drop near to freezing point when heavy woolens are required and in summers, light woolens / cottons are recommended.

External links
 Info

Hill stations in Himachal Pradesh